Tonye Garrick (born 27 August 1983), simply known as Tonye is a British-born Nigerian singer and songwriter. Her accapella song titled "What About Us?" was used at the Nigerian Youth Presidential debate in 2011. Born in England, Tonye was raised in France, Nigeria and the United States of America where she dropped her job as a business consultant to pursue a career in music in 2013. In 2015, she released a marriage-themed single title "Ari Belema" which got her nominated in the "Most Promising Act" category at the 2015 Nigeria Entertainment Awards. She is signed to Made Men Music Group since April 2016.

Growing up
Tonye is a native of Benin City in Edo State, South-South Nigeria. Her name "Tamunotonye" was given to her by her grandmother who is a native of Kalabari, Rivers State. She grew up listening to songs by Whitney Houston, Janet Jackson, Celine Dion and Brenda Fassie before she developed her interest in music at the age of 7.

Early life and education
Born in England into the family of an Edo State father who was a diplomat and an Anambra State mother, Tonye had most of her early life in Nigeria, Paris and the United States of America. She attended Vivian Fowler Memorial College and Queen's College, Lagos where she completed her secondary school education. She holds a bachelor's degree in International Business & Fashion Merchandising after graduating from Marymount University.

Career
Prior to picking music as a profession, Tonye had previously worked for UBS Financial and Deloitte Touche Tohmatsu Limited as a business analyst. She dropped her corporate job for a career in music in 2013 and went on to release her first official single titled "Were Niyen" which was received to critical acclaim. On 2 October 2014, she released another song produced by Password titled "Criminal" which did well to gain grounds. In 2015, her song titled "Abi Belema" became popular and thus winning her a nomination at the 2015 Nigeria Entertainment Awards. She cites Whitney Houston, Janet Jackson, Brandy and Aaliyah as her musical influences. In an interview granted to Thisday Live on 21 June 2014, she said she is working on her debut studio album.

Discography

Awards and nominations

See also

List of Nigerian musicians

References

External links

Official website

1983 births
Living people
Singers from London
Musicians from Edo State
21st-century Nigerian women singers
Nigerian women singer-songwriters
Vivian Fowler Memorial College for Girls alumni
Queen's College, Lagos alumni
Marymount University alumni
21st-century Black British women singers